Georges Blanc (born 2 January 1943 in Bourg-en-Bresse in the department of Ain) is a French chef and restaurateur, with three Michelin stars and four toques from the guide Gault et Millau.

Private life 
Georges Blanc the son of Jean and Paulette Blanc. He has an older sister who was born in 1933. His grandmother Élisa, known as Mere Blanc, died at her homeplace in Vonnas at the age of 66. His sons Frédéric and Alexandre Blanc support the family business.

Career
In 1962, he graduated at the École Hôtelière of Thonon-les-Bains in Haute-Savoie. Before becoming interested in working as a chef he worked as a flight attendant for Air France, traveling all over the world during one summer.

In 1965, after working in a number of renowned places, he did his military service as a chef to Amiral Vedel on the Foch and Clémenceau aircraft carriers. He joined the family business (started in 1872) working with his mother Paulette and then succeeded her in 1968 at the age of twenty five. He transformed the hotel into a luxury hotel with the subsequent development of adjacent properties into a gourmet village.

In 1970, he came third in the best sommeliers of France contest and was a finalist in the Meilleur Ouvrier de France contest in Paris in 1976.

In 1981, he received his third Michelin star and the title of Chef of the Year in the  Gault et Millau guide. In 1985, he received the rare mark of 19.5/20 from the same guide, a mark that had never before been attained.

In 1990, Georges Blanc bought the bakery and grocery store from the Charvet-Guyennet family to create the Ancienne Auberge. He also opened seventeen houses around his restaurant at the center of Vonnas to create his "village gourmand" (hotels, restaurants, shops, etc.) These are all kept in the original design with a historic theme to the Village Blanc. There is emphasis on the village being sustainable and a healthy environment. There is 12 acres around the original restaurant, about thirty houses have been renovated. It also includes hotels and spas within the village

Television
With Cyril Lignac, he is a member of the jury for the television program Un dîner vraiment parfait, a spin-off of Un dîner presque parfait (French version of Come Dine with Me) on M6.

Honours 
Commander of the Legion of Honour (11 July 2008)
Officer of the National Order of Merit (2 August 1993)
Commander du Ordre du Mérite Agricole (1993)
Knight (Chevalier) of the Ordre des Palmes Académiques (2002)
Commander of the Ordre des Arts et des Lettres (2004)

References

External links 

Official website 

1943 births
French chefs
French restaurateurs
Head chefs of Michelin starred restaurants
People from Bourg-en-Bresse
Living people